World Grand Prix may refer to:

World Grand Prix (darts), a darts tournament held in Dublin each October
World Grand Prix (snooker), a snooker tournament
World Grand Prix (video game), a 1986 video game
FIVB World Grand Prix, a women's volleyball competition